Frank Harvey Maple (26 October 1904 – 29 January 1984) was an Australian rules footballer who played with  in the Victorian Football League (VFL).

Family
Born Frank Harvey Marriott in Kent, England in 1904, he emigrated to Australia with his mother and brother in early 1907. Shortly afterwards his mother married Horace William Maple and Frank took the Maple name.

Football
Frank Maple played football for Kew before being recruited by Hawthorn at the start of the 1926 VFL season. After two games he was dropped from the side and he did not make another senior appearance. He subsequently returned to playing for Kew in the League Sub-District competition.

Death
Frank Harvey Maple died on 29 January 1984 and was cremated at Springvale Botanical Cemetery.

References

External links 

1904 births
1984 deaths
VFL/AFL players born in England
Hawthorn Football Club players
Australian rules footballers from Victoria (Australia)
People from Blean
Burials in Victoria (Australia)
English emigrants to Australia